These are the official results of the Men's High Jump event at the 1991 IAAF World Championships in Tokyo, Japan. There were a total number of 40 participating athletes, with two qualifying groups and the final held on Sunday September 1, 1991.

Schedule
All times are Japan Standard Time (UTC+9)

Results

Qualifying round
Qualification rule: 2.30 (Q) or the 12 best results (q) qualified for the final.

Final

See also
 1990 Men's European Championships High Jump
 1992 Men's Olympic High Jump
 1993 Men's World Championships High Jump

References
 Results

H
High jump at the World Athletics Championships